Intekhab Dinar is a popular Bangladeshi actor known for starring in the Ekushey Television tv series Bondhone and Chorki series Unoloukik.

Early life
The paternal grandfather of Dinar owned Purabi, a movie theater in Mymensingh.

Career
In 1995, Dinar joined the theater troupe "Nagorik Natya Somproday". He acted in several plays including Nurul Diner Sharajibon, Ocholayoton", "Mrityu Sangbad, Galileo", "Dewan Gazir Kissa and Shankha Chil.

Dinar debuted in television drama by his performing in Gor, written by Gazi Rakayet and directed by Salauddin Lavlu in 1997. Dinar acted in the drama because Rakayet inspired him to do that. Then Dinar became popular by performing in TV series Bondhone.

He also acted in films including Joyjatra and Phirey Esho Behula. Joyjatra, the 2004 Bangladeshi film, was his debut film.

After the 2010s, Intekhab Dinar became frustrated as his work declined. Then he decided to retire from acting in consultation with his family. Thus at one time he became a stranger among the new generations. In 2020, Dinar entered the world of web series by acting in Taqdeer. Then in 2021, his career resurrected by his performance in an episode of Unoloukik. Since the 2020s, he has been busy mainly acting in web series. He is now known as "web artist".

Personal life
Dinar married actress Bijori Barkatullah in 2013. The couple live in their residence of Uttara, Dhaka.

Filmography

Feature films

Television dramas

Web series

Web films

Awards and nominations

References

External links

Living people
Bangladeshi male stage actors
Bangladeshi male television actors
Bangladeshi male film actors
Male web series actors
Year of birth missing (living people)